= Cobalt(II) phosphide =

Names
- IUPAC name Cobalt(II) phosphide

Identifiers
CAS Number	129097-04-7
3D model (JSmol)	Interactive image
ChemSpider	145804
ECHA InfoCard	100.031.999
EC Number	235-212-4
PubChem CID	166621
- InChI: InChI=1S/3Co.2P/q3*+2;2*-3 Key: YYHKCTWKZVGLSL-UHFFFAOYSA-N
- SMILES: [P-3].[P-3].[Co+2].[Co+2].[Co+2]

Properties
Chemical formula	Co_{3}P_{2}
Molar mass	238.747 g/mol

Hazards
- GHS labelling
Pictograms	(GHS07: Exclamation mark) (GHS08: Health hazard)
Signal word	Warning
Hazard statements	H302, H317, H341
Precautionary statements	P203, P261, P264, P270, P272, P280, P301+P317, P302+P352, P318, P321, P330, P333+P317, P362+P364, P405, P501
- Except where otherwise noted, data are given for materials in their standard state (at 25 °C [77 °F], 100 kPa). Infobox references

Cobalt(II) phosphide is an inorganic compound with the chemical formula Co_{3}P_{2}.

It has been explored as a for hydrogen evolution reactions (HERs), including water dissociation reactions, due to its high stability and low cost.
